The Institute of Chartered Accountants of Ghana is a professional accountancy organisation.  It is the sole such organisation in Ghana with the right to award the Chartered Accountant designation, and with the right to regulate the accountancy profession in Ghana.  The Institute of Chartered Accountants (Ghana) was established by an Act of Parliament, Act 170, in 1963.  Members of the organisation are the only persons recognized under the Companies Code (Act 179) 1963, to pursue audits of company accounts in Ghana.  It is governed by a council of eleven members who are chartered accountants. The council, headed by a president, holds office for a period of two years.

The Institute of Chartered Accountants of Ghana is a member of two international bodies, the sub-regional ABWA or Association of Accountancy Bodies in West Africa, and the International Federation of Accountants (IFAC), the worldwide organization for the accountancy profession.

Past Presidents
Dr. R. S. Amegashie - 1963 to 1967
Mr. S. W. Awuku Darko - 1967 to 1969
Nana Aninkora Ababio (Mr. S. I. K. Boakye-Agyeman) - 1969 to 1974
Mr. H. A. Dodoo - 1974 to 1976
Mr. J. K. Dadson - 1976 to 1978
Mr. D. H. Simpson - 1978 to 1980
Prof. B. C. F. Lokko - 1980 to 1982
Mr. J. K. Forson - 1982 to 1984
Mr. E. M. Boye - 1984 to 1986
Mr. S. O. Annan - 1986 to 1988
Mr. K. N. Owusu - 1988 to 1990
Nii Quaye Mensah - 1990 to 1992
Mr. P. A. Abotsie - 1992 to 1994
Mr. John Sey - 1994 to 1996
Hon. Albert Kan-Dapaah - 1996 to 1996
Mr. J. N. A. Hyde - 1996 to 2008
Mr. F. D. Tweneboa - 2008 to 2000
Ms. Aurore Lokko - 2000 to 2002
Mr. J. A. Y. Klinogo - 2002 to 2004
Mr. D. T. DAcquaye - 2004 to 2006
Nana Prof. Ato Ghartey - 2006 to 2008
Mrs. Cecilia Nyann - 2008 to 2010
Mr. Joseph F. O. Blankson - 2010 to 2012

References

External links
Institute of Chartered Accountants-Ghana
Visit icag official Facebook page  on Facebook for your enquiries and questions

Auditing organizations
Member bodies of the International Federation of Accountants
Professional associations based in Ghana